Jacob Immanuel Schochet  (August 27, 1935 – July 27, 2013) was a Swiss-born Canadian rabbi who wrote on Hasidism. He was a member of the Chabad-Lubavitch movement.

Biography
Schochet's parents were Dov Yehuda and Sarah Schochet. Shortly after emigrating from the Netherlands to Toronto, Canada, in 1951, they and most of their children joined the Chabad-Lubavitch movement.  

Schochet was born in Switzerland. After moving to North America, he attended the Chabad yeshiva Tomchei Temimim in New York from which he graduated in 1958. He studied in Canada, attending the University of Toronto (BA, Phil), University of Windsor (MA, Religious Studies), McMaster University (his MPhil thesis was titled: The Treatment of Anthropomorphism in Targum Onkelos (1966)), and University of Waterloo (his PhD, Phil thesis was titled: The Psychological System of Maimonides (1974)). He was the rabbi of Kielcer Congregation in Toronto, and after 1996 of Congregation Beth Joseph.

Critical views

Criticism of Conservative, Reform, and Reconstructionist Jews
In his book Who is a Jew Schochet, an Orthodox Jew, asserted: "There can be peaceful co-existence on the communal level, and even cooperation in matters of common concerns; but there is no common ground on the religious-doctrinal level. 'Reform' and 'Conservative' can live with 'orthodox' standards and recognize the titular status of 'orthodox' rabbis. After all, 'orthodox' rabbis are ordained on the basis of their proficiency in knowledge and adjudication of Jewish law (Shulchan Aruch). This will not work in reverse, however, because the requirements for conservative and reform ordination are altogether different."

Regarding Jews who practice Reform Judaism, Conservative Judaism, Reconstructionist Judaism, and other streams of Judaism, Schochet stated: "To be sure, we must condemn wrong and misleading ideologies and practices. But simultaneously we must be of the disciples of Aaron the High Priest: 'Loving peace and pursuing peace, loving our fellow-creatures and bringing them near to the Torah'!".

Criticism of non-Orthodox Jewish conversions

Regarding the issue of 'Who is a Jew' that arose in Israeli politics in the 1970s, Schochet was a proponent for amending the Israeli Law of Return to recognize only Orthodox conversions to Judaism, as opposed to conversions performed by non-Orthodox Jewish rabbis. He published a book entitled Who Is A Jew? on the subject, wherein he rejected the notion that Jews are a part of one race or that Jews are a nationality. Instead he stated that Jews are united by their Judaism. Schochet adhered to a definition of a Jew as "those who partook in the original covenant of the Jewish faith, which established the eternal bond between God, Torah and Israel, and those who decided to join this covenant at later stages, they and their descendants are Jews."

Criticism of the Kabbalah Centre
Schochet was an opponent of the non-profit Kabbalah Centre, accusing it of distorting the teachings of the Kabbalah. He characterized their actions as cultish practices. In 1993, the Kabbalah Centre filed a  $4.5 million (U.S.) slander and defamation lawsuit in a Canadian court against him, which was still pending in 2004. In 2003 he claimed: "What they teach is heresy". In 2004 he called it a "dangerous cult." In 2007, Schochet called the teachings of the Kabbalah Centre "rubbish"; stating, "it's phony; it's manipulative; it has no spirituality whatsoever. It's not related to the authentic Kabbalah." In 2008 he claimed: "I believe they work using mind manipulation."

Criticism of critics of Chabad
Schochet responded to criticisms of Chabad-Lubavitch by Haredi Rabbi Chaim Dov Keller (Talmudic scholar and rosh yeshiva (dean) of the Telshe Yeshiva in Chicago) that appeared in the Jewish Observer, and in the book of Rabbi Dr. (and Professor) David Berger (Dean of Yeshiva University's Bernard Revel Graduate School of Jewish Studies, and Chair of the Jewish Studies department at Yeshiva College of Yeshiva University), The Rebbe, the Messiah, and the Scandal of Orthodox Indifference. Schochet attempted to demonstrate that criticisms were unfounded or distorted.

Criticism of 'Jews for Jesus' and Christian missionaries
In the 1970s and 1980s, Schochet was involved in anti-missionaries activities, and working with Jewish youths to bring them back to their Jewish roots. "For a Jew, however, any form of shituf is tantamount to idolatry in the fullest sense of the word. There is then no way that a Jew can ever accept Jesus as a deity, mediator or savior (messiah), or even as a prophet, without betraying Judaism. To call oneself, therefore, a 'Hebrew-Christian,' a 'Jew for Jesus,' or in the latest version a 'messianic Jew,' is an oxymoron. Just as one cannot be a 'Christian Buddhist,' or a 'Christian for Krishna,' one cannot be a 'Jew for Jesus,'" Schochet said. Schochet debated missionaries, including Michael L. Brown.

Criticism of Kosher Jesus
In January 2012, Schochet sent a letter to the Algemeiner Journal, expressing what he described as his "authoritative view" rejecting Shmuley Boteach's book Kosher Jesus, opining that it was "heretical". He wrote "I have never read a book, let alone one authored by a purported frum Jew, that does more to enhance the evangelical missionary message and agenda than the aforementioned book. The grossly distorted message of the book violates basic premises of original and authentic Jewish tradition, thus unavoidably must be rejected for being heretical. It is my sincerest hope that the author recognizes the error of his ways and looks to make amends by retracting the book".

On the other hand, Australian Orthodox Chabad Rabbi Moshe Gutnick, while agreeing with some of what Boteach said and disagreeing with other points, wrote: "The suggestion that [Boteach] is a heretic is simply ludicrous". Rabbi Michael Samuel of Temple Beth Sholom in Chula Vista, California, opined: "Lubavitchers do not want to know anything about Jesus." 

Boteach, for his part, said: "We are the People of the Book. We aren’t the people who ban books." Boteach further responded to Schochet, stating that his "ban" of the book was "arrogant and un-Jewish," as well as "medieval."

References

External links
 Schochet's review of Berger's book
 Schochet's response to Keller

20th-century Canadian rabbis
21st-century Canadian rabbis
Canadian biblical scholars
Canadian Hasidic rabbis
Chabad-Lubavitch rabbis
Jewish biblical scholars
Swiss Ashkenazi Jews
Swiss emigrants to Canada
Writers from Toronto
1935 births
2013 deaths
20th-century Jewish biblical scholars
Rabbis from Toronto